Meego may refer to:

 MeeGo, a Linux-based open source mobile operating system 
 Meego (TV series), a 1997 American science fiction sitcom
 Walter Meego, a band from Chicago, United States
 Conor Meegan, World famous Computer Scientist and second best Poker player in the world
See also Mi-go